Era Bell Thompson (August 10, 1905 – December 30, 1986) was an American writer and editor.

Thompson was born in Des Moines, Iowa, to an African American family, the only daughter of Steward “Tony” Thompson and Mary Logan Thompson, the children of formerly enslaved people.  She graduated from the University of North Dakota (UND), pursued a career as an author, and was an editor for Ebony magazine in Chicago.

Thompson was a recipient of the governor of North Dakota's Roughrider Award, and a multicultural center at UND is named for her.

Early years
In 1914, her parents moved Thompson and her three brothers to Driscoll, North Dakota, where they were the only black family in the small community, and she and her brothers were often the only African-Americans in the schools they attended. Thompson would find herself in similar situations for much of her youth and into early adulthood. She wrote years later of her ignorance of blacks before she moved to Chicago following her graduation from college.

Thompson graduated from Bismarck High, where she had excelled in sports and pursued journalism, often to cope with the isolation she often felt.  She enrolled at the University of North Dakota in 1925, and she excelled in track and field, breaking several school records, tying two national records, and earning the distinction of being one of the state's greatest athletes. However, during her second year of college, an extended bout with pleurisy left her too debilitated to run track and forced her to leave school.

She moved to Chicago and worked in a variety of short-lived clerical jobs before landing one at a magazine. For three months and for a pay of ten dollars a week, she “learned how to run a magazine on hope, patience, and a very worn shoe string; to proofread and write advertising copy—and keep warm by burning magazines in an old fireplace,” Thompson writes in her autobiography. After an illness to her father she was forced to return to North Dakota, where she worked for the Rev. Robert O'Brian family doing chores in exchange for financial support for her and her family.

Literary career
She returned to college with the support of the Rev. Robert O'Brian family and received a B.A. degree from Morningside College in Sioux City, Iowa. Returning to Chicago, she did postgraduate work at Northwestern University’s Medill School of Journalism. Initially unable to find a job in journalism, Thompson worked a number of small clerical jobs while continuing to write small personal writing projects and, thanks in part to a fellowship from Newberry Library, an autobiography. Published in 1946, it is entitled American Daughter.

In 1947, Thompson came to the attention of Ebony. She joined the magazine as associate editor. Two years after becoming co-managing editor, she began her foreign reporting in 1953.  She was instrumental in shaping Ebony magazine's vision and guiding its coverage for approximately forty years while serving in a variety of editorial capacities.

In 1954, she published a second book, Africa, Land of My Fathers, based on a tour of 18 countries in Africa. Thompson was still listed as an editor of Ebony in 1985, an indication of her longevity with the publication. She was praised for her efforts in promoting both racial and gender understanding. She died in Chicago on December 30, 1986.

In 2020, Thompson was inducted into the Chicago Literary Hall of Fame.

Bibliography
Thompson, Era Bell (1946). American Daughter (Chicago: The University of Chicago Press, 119.
Thompson, Era Bell (1954). Africa: Land of My Fathers. (Garden City, N.Y.: Doubleday).

References

Further reading

External links
Biography at African American Registry website
 Read North Dakota,  Era Bell Thompson Biography
 

African-American women journalists
African-American journalists
1905 births
1986 deaths
People from Grand Forks, North Dakota
Morningside University alumni
Medill School of Journalism alumni
Writers from North Dakota
African-American media personalities
African-American women writers
African-American writers
American women journalists
20th-century American women writers
20th-century American non-fiction writers
Journalists from North Dakota
20th-century American journalists
20th-century African-American women
20th-century African-American people